The Air Member for Personnel (AMP) is the senior Royal Australian Air Force officer who is responsible for personnel matters.

List of Air Members for Personnel
The following officers have served as Air Member for Personnel:

Group Captain Stanley Goble (1928–32)
Group Captain William Anderson (1933–34)
Air Commodore Stanley Goble (1934)
Air Commodore Hazelton Nicholl (RAF) (1935–37)
Air Vice-Marshal Stanley Goble (1937–39)
Air Commodore John Russell (RAF) (1939–40)
Air Commodore William Anderson (1940)
Air Commodore, then Air Vice-Marshal, Henry Wrigley (1940–42)
Air Commodore Frank Lukis (1942–43)
Air Vice-Marshal William Anderson (1943–44)
Air Vice-Marshal Adrian Cole (1944–45)
Air Commodore Joe Hewitt (1945–48)
Air Vice-Marshal Frank Bladin (1948–53)
Air Vice-Marshal Valston Hancock (1953–55)
Air Vice-Marshal William Hely (1955 – acting)
Air Vice-Marshal Frederick Scherger (1955–57)
Air Vice-Marshal Allan Walters (1957–59)
Air Vice-Marshal William Hely (1960–66)
Air Vice Marshal Douglas Candy (1966–69)
Air Vice-Marshal Brian Eaton (1969–73)
Air Vice-Marshal John Jordan (1975–76)

List of Chiefs of Air Force Personnel
The following officers have served as Chief of Air Force Personnel:

Air Vice-Marshal John Jordan (1976)
Air Vice-Marshal Ian Parker (1976–79)
Air Vice-Marshal Harold Parker (1979–81)
Air Vice-Marshal Raymond Trebilco (1981–82)
Air Vice-Marshal Edward Radford (1983–85)

References

Air force appointments
Royal Australian Air Force